In France, the French constitution of 4 October 1958 was revised many times in its early years. Changes in this fundamental law have become more frequent since the 1990s. This has had two major causes: the desire to modernize public institutions on one hand, and adapting to the European Union and to international law on the other.

Overview

Amendment procedures

Article 89 

The revision of the Constitution under Article 89 of the Constitution:<ref>Article 89 of the Constitution, version in force since 25 July 2008 (translated)</ref>

In its current form, article 89 and 42 state that "the plenary discussion of the draft constitutional amendment ... carries, on first reading to the first meeting, on the text submitted by the Government, and for further reading on the text sent by the other parliamentary branch" (and not on the text adopted by the committee as ordinary laws). Furthermore, "the discussion in meeting, first reading of a draft or a bill can only occur before the first assembly, until the expiration of a period of six weeks after filing. It can only occur before the second meeting at the expiration of a period of four weeks from the date of transmission."

The Constitutional Council declared itself incompetent to rule on a constitutional revision.

 Other ways to amend 
Since the beginning of the French Fifth Republic, revisions have been adopted without using section 89. 
 The Constitutional Act of 4 June, 1960 was adopted by a parliamentary vote according to original article 85 of the Constitution, which involved the Senate of the Community.
 The Constitutional Act of 6 November, 1962 was adopted, without any parliamentary procedure, through direct referendum by Article 11 of the French constitution. The use of this procedure to revise the Constitution has been strongly criticized, as the article text does not explicitly provide that it can be used to revise the Constitution.

 When amendments are effective 
Unless otherwise stated, the provisions of the constitutional laws come into force on the date of enactment.

However, some recent constitutional laws have provided a delayed effective date. The material content of the Constitution, in these cases, changes on different dates from those of other enactments of constitutional laws.

For example, the constitution act of 23 July 2008 provides in article 46 that some sections of the reform are effective on 1 March 2009 and others "under the conditions established by law and necessary for their implementing organic laws" (translated).Original: dans les conditions fixées par les lois et lois organiques nécessaires à leur application. Thus the old wording of certain articles remained in force for more than eighteen months after the constitutional amendment, while implementing laws were not all ready. This is notably the case of the establishment of referendums initiated by the parliament and supported by a part of the electorate, which is foreseen in the new version of Article 11.

The same constitutional amendment provides in Article 47 that certain amendments of the articles of the Constitution relating to the European Union come into force at the time Lisbon Treaty becomes effective. This occurred on 1 December 2009 and the new content of these articles came into force on that date.

The Constitutional Law of 1 March 2005 had planned similar provisions concerning entry into force of the Treaty establishing a Constitution for Europe, which have become obsolete due to the termination of the process of ratification of this Treaty.

 Adopted amendments 

 All amendments 
The French Constitution of the Fifth Republic  was revised twenty-four different times since 1958:

 1962: Election of the President of the Republic by direct universal suffrage 
Wanting to override the likely opposition of the Senate, De Gaulle revised the constitution by using Article 11, which allows the president to submit to referendum "any bill on the organization of government.''" The legality of using this method is very questionable, as the Constitution provides mechanisms for its own review in section 89 (a referendum is possible, but only with the agreement of the parliament). It aroused intense political debate and legal controversy, and the formation of a secret group of votes against (cartel des non).

However, the prestige of De Gaulle, the fact that the "yes" won with over 62% of the vote, and the fact that the Constitutional Council refuses to review the constitutionality of laws passed by referendum (as they are adopted by the people), allowed the implementation of this reform.

In practice, this reform has not only changed the method of electing the President, it has also significantly increased its powers by giving it a popular legitimacy not shared by the Prime Minister. For example, the President could, except in periods of cohabitation, ask the prime minister to resign, which is not provided in the text of the original.

1974: Reform of the method of referral to the Constitutional Council

Background 
The Constitutional Council was intended by Michel Debré and Charles de Gaulle to be a gun against the Parliament, as part of a  Thus, the Commission's role was primarily to enforce Article 34 of the Constitution, limiting the encroachments of the parliament and, in contrast, creating a strong and independent executive. However, Constitutional Decision 71-44 DC of 16 July 1971 gave a new place to the Constitutional Council.

Review 
Because of this, the Constitutional Council needed reform. Valéry Giscard d'Estaing, newly elected President of the Republic, wanted to expand the ability to refer legislation to the Constitutional Council to members of parliament (60 deputies or 60 senators), allowing a large enough opposition to refer legislation the Constitutional Council and so ensure compliance with the Constitution.

He also wanted the Constitutional Council to be able to take the initiative to review legislation that they claimed infringed on civil liberties guaranteed by the preamble or the body of the Constitution, so that every law would actually be consistent with the Constitution. Indeed, in the absence of the political will for a parliamentary referral, a law contrary to the Constitution can enter into force. The National Assembly, however, prevented this provision, especially because it could "lead almost inevitably to the Council using it to prejudge the decision they will have to take"(translated). if they had already said they would choose to review a law.

Consequences 
The constitutional revision of 1974, though it was called a "small reform" when it was voted on by Congress, has profoundly upset French political action, better ensuring the superiority of the Constitution over the laws. There were 54 constitutional decisions between 1958 and 1975, there were more than 200 in the next 15 years, between 1975 and 1990. However, the problem of referral remained unresolved: it was still possible today to see a law contrary to the Constitution coming into force, with the excesses that it could carry. An independent referral to the parliamentary and executive power seemed essential, as was the case in Germany or Spain. Since March 2010, the Priority Question of Constitutionality opened ability to refer legislation to any person who, in the course of a proceeding, challenges the constitutionality of a statutory provision. This referral allows, after being filtered by the Supreme Court of jurisdiction, (Court of Cassation or Council of State) to ask the Constitutional Council to repeal this provision, if it is contrary to a right or freedom that Constitution guarantees.

1992: Maastricht Treaty 

This amendment was intended to  make the Constitution compatible with the Treaty on European Union .

2000: The Quinquennat 
 
A five-year presidential term of office was presented for the first time on 10 September 1973 by Georges Pompidou. The text was passed in identical terms by the National Assembly and the Senate, but was not submitted to Congress for final approval. The President did not continue the action, as he could not muster the required three-fifths majority in Congress and because of resistance to his project.

The bill of 2000 is the first constitutional amendment submitted to referendum pursuant to section 89 of the Constitution. After 73% of "yes" votes on 24 September 2000, it passed on October 2. It limited the term of French presidents to five years, but was not applied to the president, Jacques Chirac, who was elected in 1995 for seven years. The main motivation for this revision was to avoid cohabitation, by matching the term of office of the President with the Deputies. Indeed, when the parliamentary majority did not support the President, he would be forced to appoint a hostile prime minister as a minister of his party and would be likely be reversed by the National Assembly.

2005: Charter for the Environment
The Constitution includes in its preamble, since 1 March 2005, the Charter for the Environment of ten articles, initiated by  President of the Republic Jacques Chirac and drafted by a Commission led by Yves Coppens.

2008: Ratification of the Treaty of Lisbon 
For the subsequent ratification of the Treaty of Lisbon, a revision of Title XV of the Constitution was passed by Congress on February 4, 2008, by 560 votes against 181. The Constitutional Law was issued on the same day.

The amendments to the Constitution endorse the transfer of sovereignty listed in the Treaty of Lisbon by direct reference to the text. Thirty areas covered so far by the unanimity rule as the common agricultural policy or criminal justice, now will require a vote of a supermajority.

In terms of institutional functioning, changes reflected in constitutional terms relating to the powers granted to national parliaments.

As of the entry into force of the Lisbon Treaty, Title XV of the Constitution will be amended according to Article 2 of the Constitution Act.

Article 3 of the Constitution Act revokes the provisions of Article 3 of the Constitutional Law No. 2005-204 of 1 March 2005 which amended Title XV of the Constitution "from the entry into force of this Treaty": these constitutional provisions are not in force and are now devoid of purpose.

2008: Institutional reform 

In continuation of the work of the "Balladur" committee Parliament met in Congress and adopted on 21 July 2008 a constitutional amendment that creates or amends 47 articles of the Constitution: articles 1, 3, 4, 6, 11, 13, 16, 17, 18, 24, 25, 34, 34-1 (new ), 35, 38, 39, 41, 42, 43, 44, 45, 46, 47, 47-1, 47-2 (new), 48, 49, 50-1, 51-1 (new), 51-2 (new), 56, 61, 61-1 (new), 62, 65, 69, 70, 71, 71-1 (new), 72-3, 73, 74-1, 75-1 (new), 87 (new), 88-4, 88-5, 89. The vote was 539 votes in favor acquired with the adoption threshold is 538 votes, or two-thirds of the votes cast.

Abandoned or unratified amendments 
In 1969, Charles de Gaulle had a bill on the creation of the regions and on the renovation of the Senate. Adopted by both houses, the referendum of April 27, 1969 rejected (52.4% no, Charles de Gaulle, taking note of the refusal of the French people, immediately resigned). Regionalization was finally put into place via legislation, notably in 1972 and a 2003 constitutional revision which constitutionalized the region.

In 1974, Valéry Giscard d'Estaing, seeking to amend Article 25 of the Constitution to make the rules of the dual office holding between a parliamentary office and functions of government. The project was approved by both chambers but the president did not pursue the matter further.

In 1984, François Mitterrand wanted to expand the scope of the referendum from Article 11 to extend the basic guarantees of civil liberties The bill was passed by the National Assembly but rejected by the Senate.

Referral to the Constitutional Council by citizens in the framework of the institution of constitutional review by exception was first presented by François Mitterrand in 1990 the bill was approved by the National Assembly, as amended by the Senate and eventually withdrawn by the Government. A new bill, introduced in 1993, was abandoned after deliberation by the Senate. Finally, the priority question of constitutionality was introduced to the article 61-1 de la constitution|Article 61-1 of the Constitution by section 29 of the Act Constitution of 23 July 2008.

In 1998, Jacques Chirac undertook to reform the Supreme Judicial Council. Filed on 15 April 1998, the bill was adopted by both houses on 18 November 1998.  The bill was not presented to Congress. However, the composition of the said Council would be reformed via the constitutional amendment of July 23, 2008.

Jacques Chirac presented a bill about French Polynesia and New Caledonia. Filed  on 26 May 1999, it was adopted by both houses on October 12. The decree of 3 November 1999 intending to submit these two bills in the Parliament in Congress January 24, 2000, but was removed from consideration by the decree of the President of the Republic of 19 January 2000. Later these collectivities will be globally affected by the constitutional revision of 28 March 2003 on the decentralized organization of the Republic. New Caledonia would then be covered by the constitutional amendment of February 23, 2003 for its constituency and French Polynesia, the Organic Act No. 2004-192 of 27 February 2004 concerning the autonomy of French Polynesia.

In 2011, Nicolas Sarkozy wished to include in the Constitution rules providing for a gradual return to a balanced budget, called "Golden Rule", which was passed by both houses on second reading by the Senate July 11, 2011 and third reading in identical terms by the National Assembly July 13, 2011. Due to the inability to raise the necessary three-fifths majority in Congress, President Nicolas Sarkozy abandoned this amendment, hoping to resume if re-elected, which was not the case. Finally, Parliament adopted, in November 2012, a simple organic law which takes the idea of the Golden Rule

On 13 March 2013, under the chairmanship of François Hollande four bills are presented in the Council of Ministers: 
 Remove the Law Court of the Republic
 Changing the composition of the Supreme Judicial Council, the appointment of prosecutors must comply with the Commission's
 No dual mandate between the Government and local executive offices. The presidents will become members of Constitutional Council after they leave office.
 The representative unions must negotiate before the discussion of legislation on labor law, employment or vocational training

The Government wanted Congress to meet in July, but due to time and an insufficient majority, only one bill was discussed in Parliament (the one on the High Judicial Council) where the Senate had cleared the bill of its content. Following this, the Government was forced to postpone revisions.

Study groups on the constitutional amendments 
Several committees have been formally constituted to formulate proposals to overhaul governmental institutions:
 Vedel Commission, chaired by Professor of Public Law Georges Vedel in 1993. Although there were no immediate results, his work were used for study and reforms that followed, particularly in 1995 and 2008.
 Truche Commission in 1997, led by Pierre Truche, first president of the Court of Cassation, responsible for a study on reform to Supreme judicial council. The constitutional amendment proposed in 1998 as a result of his work did not succeed. The study will be repeated in 2007 and would be presented in part during the constitutional revision of July 2008.
 The Avril Commission, chaired by Professor of Public Law Pierre Avril, in 2002, invited comments on the criminal status of the President of the Republic. This work would inspire in part the constitutional revision of February 23, 2007.
 Committee discussion and proposals on the modernization and consolidation of institutions, or "Balladur commission", was chaired by former Prime Minister Edouard Balladur in 2007. The constitutional amendment resulting from the findings of the committee was adopted by the Congress on July 21, 2008. 
 The Veil Commission, chaired by former minister and magistrate Simone Veil In 2008, asked to rule on whether to introduce new rights in the preamble of the Constitution. The commission finally considered a single addition to Article 1} of the Constitution to include a reference to a principle of "equal dignity of everyone"
 Commission on renewal and ethics in public life, called "Jospin commission", chaired by former Prime Minister Lionel Jospin, was charged in 2012 to propose a reform of public life. It makes 35 propositions on the presidential election, Parliament, limiting which public offices can be held at the same time, the jurisdictional status of the executive and the prevention of conflicts of interest.

Timeline of French constitutions

Notes

Constitutional laws cited

Proposed constitutional laws cited

Organic Laws Cited 
For more information on organic law, see the article Organic law.

References

Translator's Notes 

 
Constitutions of France
French Fifth Republic